John Hobart may refer to:

Sir John Hobart, 2nd Baronet (1593–1647), English MP for Cambridge, Lostwithiel, Brackley and Norfolk 1641–1647
Sir John Hobart, 3rd Baronet (1628–1683), English MP for Norfolk 1673–1685
John Hobart, 1st Earl of Buckinghamshire (1693–1756), English MP for St Ives and Norfolk 1727–1728, Treasurer of the Chamber
John Hobart, 2nd Earl of Buckinghamshire (1723–1793), English MP for Norwich, Lord of the Bedchamber and Lord Lieutenant of Ireland
John Sloss Hobart (1738–1805), U.S. Senator from New York
John Henry Hobart (1775–1830), Episcopal Bishop of New York